Michele Benedetti (born 17 December 1984) is an Italian diver.

Benedetti is an athlete of the Gruppo Sportivo della Marina Militare,

Biography
He was born in Parma. In the 10 meters platform synchronized event he won the bronze medal at the 2006 European Championships and another bronze medal in the 3 meters springboard event at the 2009 European Diving Championships. He also finished twelfth in the 3 meters springboard event at the 2009 Fina World Championships.

References

External links
 London Olympics Biography

1984 births
Living people
Italian male divers
Sportspeople from Parma
Divers at the 2012 Summer Olympics
Divers at the 2016 Summer Olympics
Olympic divers of Italy
Divers of Marina Militare
20th-century Italian people
21st-century Italian people